Alhaja Kudirat Abiola (born Kudirat Olayinka Adeyemi), popularly known simply as Kudirat Abiola (1951 – 4 June 1996), was a Nigerian pro-democracy campaigner. She was assassinated whilst her husband, Moshood Abiola, was being detained by the Nigerian Government. He was the winning candidate in elections that had taken place in Nigeria in 1993 and was arrested shortly after they were summarily annulled by the ruling junta.

Life
She was born in 1951 in Zaria in Nigeria. Alhaja Kudirat Abiola was the second woman to have married her husband. At the time of her death, she was his senior wife.

She was assassinated whilst her husband was being detained by the Nigerian Government. Her husband was believed to have been the winning candidate in the Nigerian elections that had taken place in 1993, and he was arrested shortly after they were annulled by the government of the dictator Ibrahim Babangida. The killing was the subject of an investigation and trial many years later. According to accounts, the murder was ordered and then carried out by six men. Abiola died in her car from machine gun fire. Her driver also died. Her personal assistant, who was later accused of being involved with her assassins, was in the car but was not hurt.

Her husband continued to be detained without charge after her death. He died in suspicious circumstances just before it was said that he was to be released on 7 July 1998.

Legacy
At the time of her death an anti-military rule "Radio Democracy" had just been created and it was based in Norway. It was backed by the American, British, Swedish, Danish and Norwegian governments to help end military dictatorship in Nigeria. The Radio station's name was changed to Radio Kudirat.

In 1998 a street corner in New York was renamed Kudirat Abiola Corner, despite protests by the Nigerian Government.

In October 1998 Major Hamza Al-Mustapha appeared in court with the previous President Abacha's son Mohammed, charged with the murder of Kudirat Abiola. At the trial the self-confessed killer, Sergeant Barnabas Jabila, said he was obeying orders from his superior, Hamza Al-Mustapha.

On 30 June 2012 Hamza Al-Mustapha and Alhaji Lateef Shofolahan were sentenced to be hanged for the murder of Alhaja Kudirat Abiola. Al Mustapha had been a Presidential Chief security officer whilst Shofolahan had been his victim's personal assistant. The two were later released on appeal by a court in Lagos.

Abiola remains a symbol of Nigeria's struggle for democracy. Nineteen years after her death there were demonstrations at her graveside. A documentary, "The Supreme Price" details the story of how both Abiola and her husband paid a terrible cost in their quest for a better, freer Nigeria. It was directed by Joanna Lipper, a lecturer at Harvard University, who tells the story from her daughter, Hafsat's perspective. The documentary also includes interviews with Walter Carrington, former U.S. ambassador to Nigeria, and Nobel Prize-winning writer Wole Soyinka.

References

1951 births
1996 deaths
People from Zaria
Nigerian Muslims
Kudirat
Spouses of Nigerian politicians
20th-century Nigerian politicians
1996 murders in Nigeria
People murdered in Lagos
Deaths by firearm in Nigeria
Violence against women in Nigeria
Yoruba women in politics
20th-century Nigerian women politicians
Female murder victims
20th-century Nigerian women